A room and power mill was a type of textile mill found in Lancashire, England, in the 19th century. Small businesses paid the owner rent for space for their machines and power from the mill engine or waterwheel.

The system
In, for example Nelson, many mills were operated by The Nelson Room and Power Company and the Walverden Room and Power Company. This allowed specialised companies to start up. Such a company may have had 20 dobby looms and just do "fancies".

Examples
Beehive Mill, Jersey Street, Great Ancoats
Brownsfield Mill, Great Ancoats
Vale Mill, Todmorden

See also
:Category:Lists of textile mills in the United Kingdom
List of mills owned by the Lancashire Cotton Corporation Limited
List of mills in Rochdale
List of mills in Oldham

References

Bibliography

Textile mills
History of the textile industry
History of Lancashire